Alan Raymond Mais, Baron Mais, GBE, GCStJ TD, ERD, JP (7 July 1911 – 28 November 1993) was a Labour Party Life peer and Lord Mayor of the City of London for 1972–1973.

Early life 
Born in Southampton, the only child of Ernest Mais, a Master Mariner, he was educated at Banister Court School, Hampshire, before attending the College of Estate Management, where he trained as a surveyor. 

Mais worked for engineers Richard Costain and Parker Construction before setting up his own consulting practice.

Military service 

During World War II Mais served as a Major with Special Forces in France, Iran and Iraq. After returning to Britain late in 1943, his orders were to develop the Mulberry harbour project for the D-Day landings. 

When construction began off the Normandy coast immediately after D-day (6 June 1944) Mais, promoted Lieutenant-Colonel, was in charge of constructing the pierheads and floating roadways at the British harbour under Colonel Stuart Gilbert of the Royal Engineers, who commanded the port construction force. 

He then joined the Canadians in the advance to the Rhine and, promoted full Colonel, became Deputy Chief engineer at Antwerp.

Career 
After the War, Mais joined contractors Trollope & Colls, becoming joint-managing director and chairman in 1963 and retiring in 1968 when the firm was taken over by Trafalgar House.

Created a Life Peer by Harold Wilson in 1967, he took the title Baron Mais, of Walbrook in the City of London, before sitting in the House of Lords on the Labour, then Liberal and Liberal Democrats benches.

Lord Mais was admitted as a Freeman of the City of London, becoming Master of the Cutlers' Company and then of the Paviors' Company. He also served as Alderman for the Walbrook Ward from 1963, as Sheriff of London for 1969–70, before being elected as Lord Mayor of London in 1972, the first peer to serve concurrently in that office. He was also HM Lieutenant of the City, a Justice of the Peace and from 1976 Deputy Lieutenant for the County of Kent.

In February 1978, a series of lectures was initiated bearing his name, with Gordon Richardson, then Governor of the Bank of England, providing the inaugural lecture. The annual Mais Lecture was regarded as a leading event in the banking and financial community of the City of London, having hosted each of the subsequent Governors of the Bank of England, as well as Prime Ministers, Chancellors of the Exchequer, and European Central Bankers.

Personal life 
In 1936 Mais married Lorna Aline, daughter of Stanley Aspinall Boardman, wool merchant, of Addiscombe in Surrey, by whom he had two sons and a daughter.

References

External links
‘Mais, Alan Raymond, Baron Mais (1911–1993)’, Oxford Dictionary of National Biography

1911 births
1993 deaths
Politicians from Southampton
Alumni of University College of Estate Management
Royal Engineers officers
British Army personnel of World War II
Sheriffs of the City of London
20th-century lord mayors of London
20th-century English politicians
Labour Party (UK) life peers
Liberal Party (UK) life peers
Liberal Democrats (UK) life peers
Life peers created by Elizabeth II
Presidents of the Smeatonian Society of Civil Engineers
Knights Grand Cross of the Order of the British Empire
Bailiffs Grand Cross of the Order of St John
English justices of the peace
English surveyors